Abdoulaye Ndiaye may refer to:
 Abdoulaye Ndiaye (businessman)
 Abdoulaye Ndiaye (footballer)
 Abdoulaye N'Diaye, Senegalese sprinter